Alberta Provincial Highway No. 58, commonly referred to as Highway 58, is an east–west highway in northwest Alberta, Canada. It starts west of the Rainbow Lake Airport and passes through the towns of Rainbow Lake and High Level before it ends at the Wood Buffalo National Park boundary west of Garden River.

An extension to Wood Buffalo National Park opened on November 8, 2011 under a joint project between Government of Alberta, the Government of Canada, and the Little Red River Cree Nation (LRRCN) to construct  of all weather roads to provide access to the LRRCN communities of Garden River and Fox Lake.

At its western extremity, Highway 58 continues as a winter road (commonly referred to as Border Road/Powerline Road/Sierra Road), which connects to Highway 97 (Alaska Highway) in British Columbia at Fort Nelson. At its eastern extremity, Highway 58 continues as a Garden River Road within Wood Buffalo National Park to Garden River.

The highway is designated as a Northern/Remote Route within Canada's National Highway System.

Peace Point 
A separate unsigned segment of Alberta Highway 58 continues as Pine Lake Road through Wood Buffalo National Park, terminating at Alberta Highway 48. The junction at Peace Point continues as an unsigned segment and winter road of Alberta Highway 59 Moose Island road and winter Highway to Fort Chipewyan.

Major intersections

References 

058